The Orthodox Church of Greece - Holy Synod in Resistance (SiR) was an Old Calendarist church.

History
The Holy Synod in Resistance was established in 1984.

The first Holy Synod President of the SiR is Metropolitan Cyprian of Oropos and Fili; he was elected to this position in 1985.

Metropolitan Cyprian of Oropos and Fili died in 2013. He was succeeded as president by Metropolitan  (Cyprian II) of Oropos and Fili.

The SiR ceased to exist on March 18, 2014, when it merged into with the Church of the Genuine Orthodox Christians of Greece (a Greek Old Calendarists group) under the presidency of Archbishop Kallinikos of Athens.

Presidents 

 Metropolitan Cyprian of Oropos and Fili (1985–2013)
 Metropolitan  of Oropos and Fili (2013–14)

References

External links
The official website (English and Greek)
Another official website
Announce of the merge

Old Calendarist church bodies and jurisdictions
20th-century Eastern Orthodoxy
Religious organizations disestablished in 2014
Former Christian denominations
21st-century Eastern Orthodoxy